= Arts Plaza =

Public park and plaza in Gresham, Oregon, U.S.

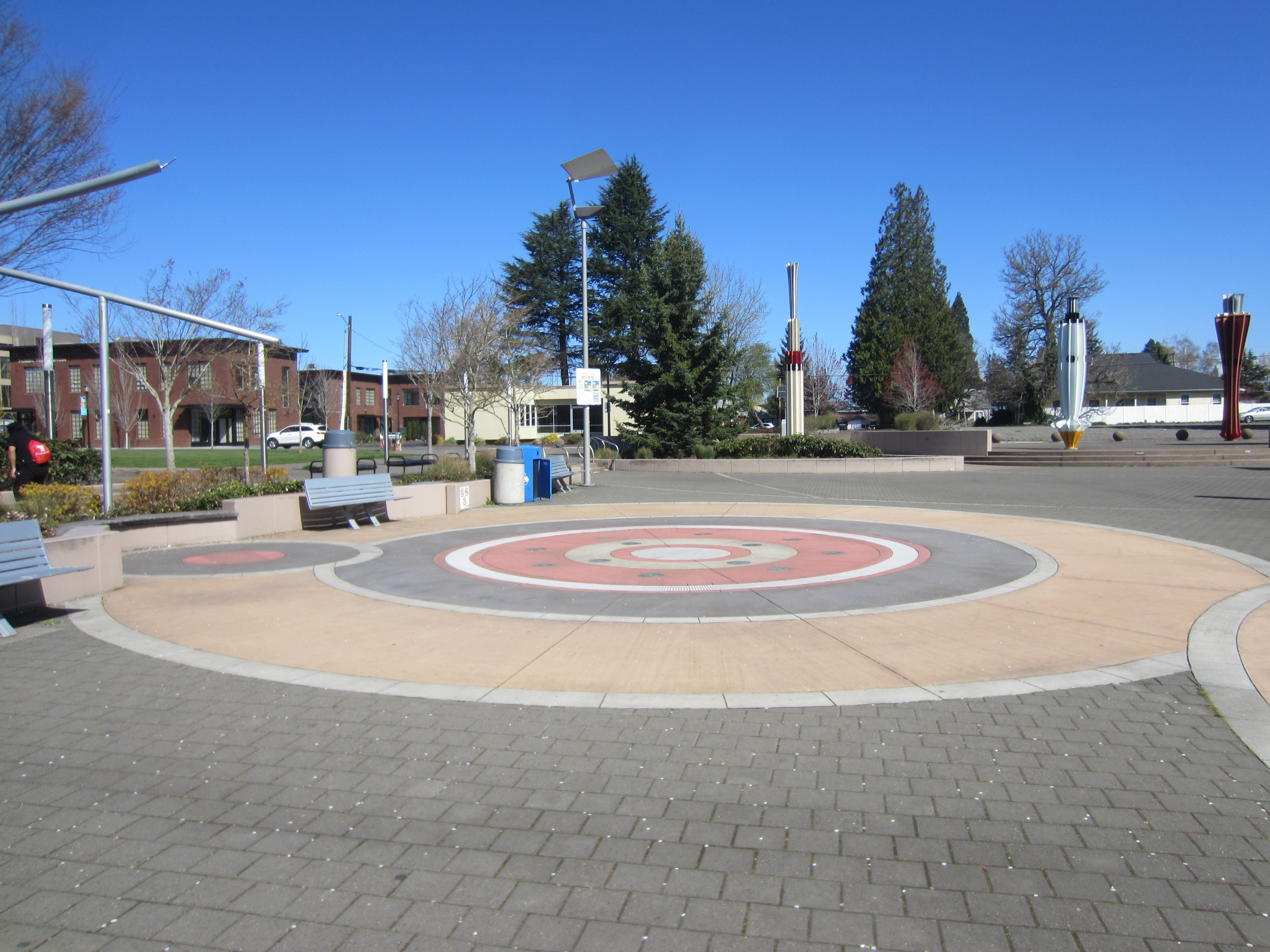
- The plaza in 2021

- Location within Oregon
- Interactive map of Arts Plaza
- Location: Gresham, Oregon, U.S.
- Coordinates: 45°29′57″N 122°25′37″W

Arts Plaza (also known as Center for the Arts Plaza) is a public plaza, park, and open-air venue in Gresham, Oregon.

== Features ==
The Children's Fountain was added in 2014.

The plaza features Claudia Fitch's art installation Fine Tuned Tulle, which has four pillars representing dance, literature, music, and the visual arts in the form of a tutu, fountain pen, trumpet, and paint brush.

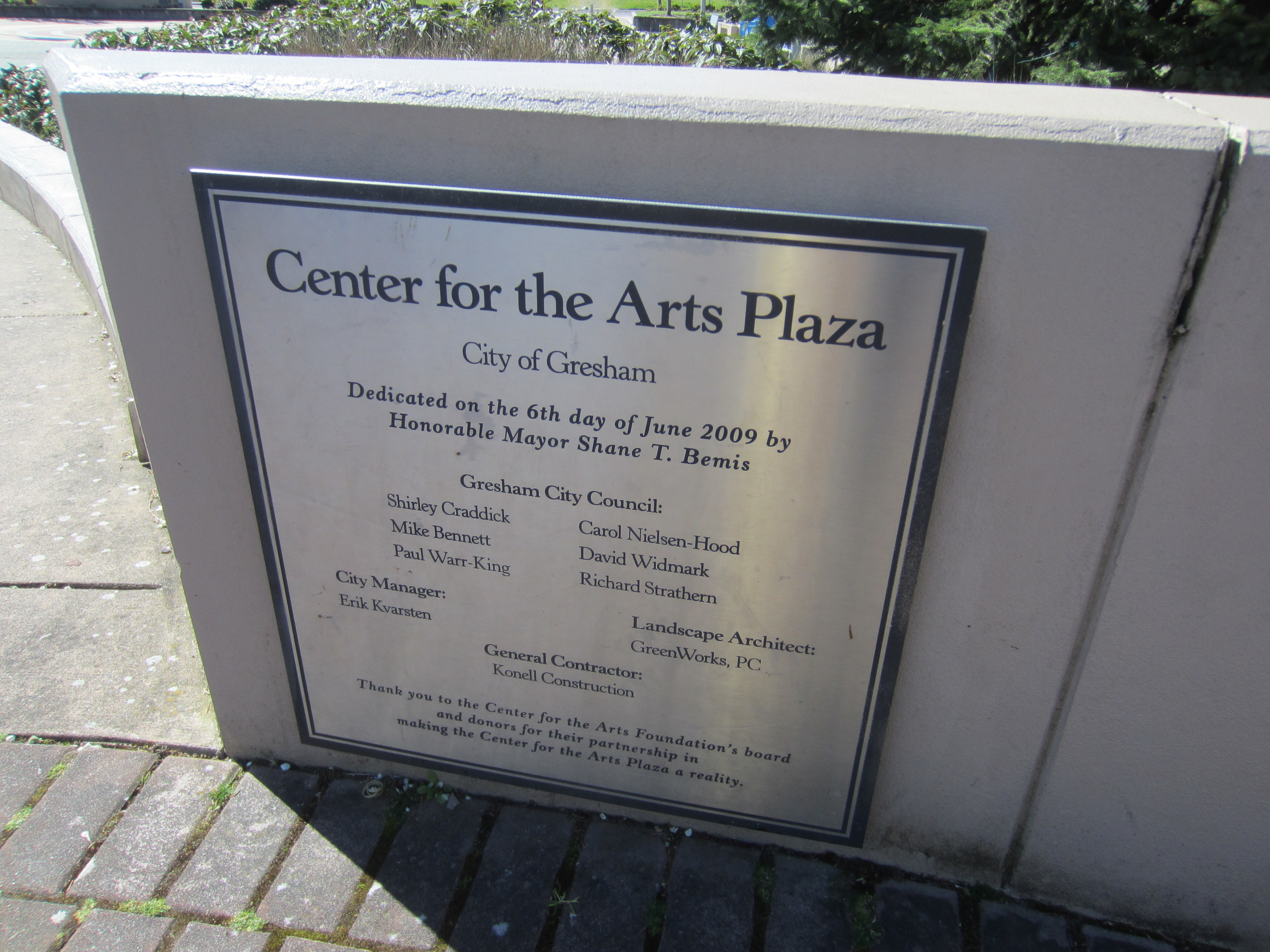

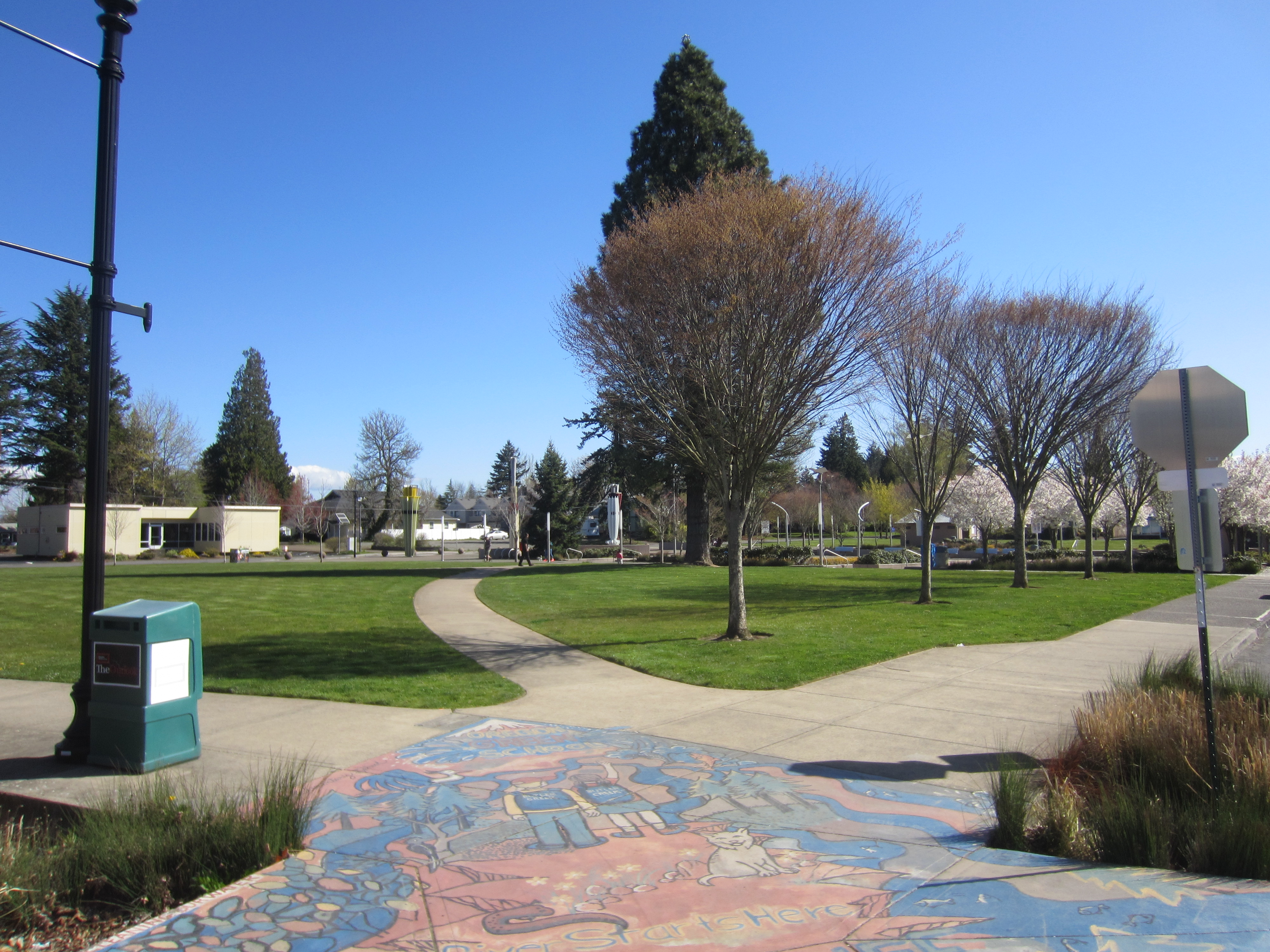

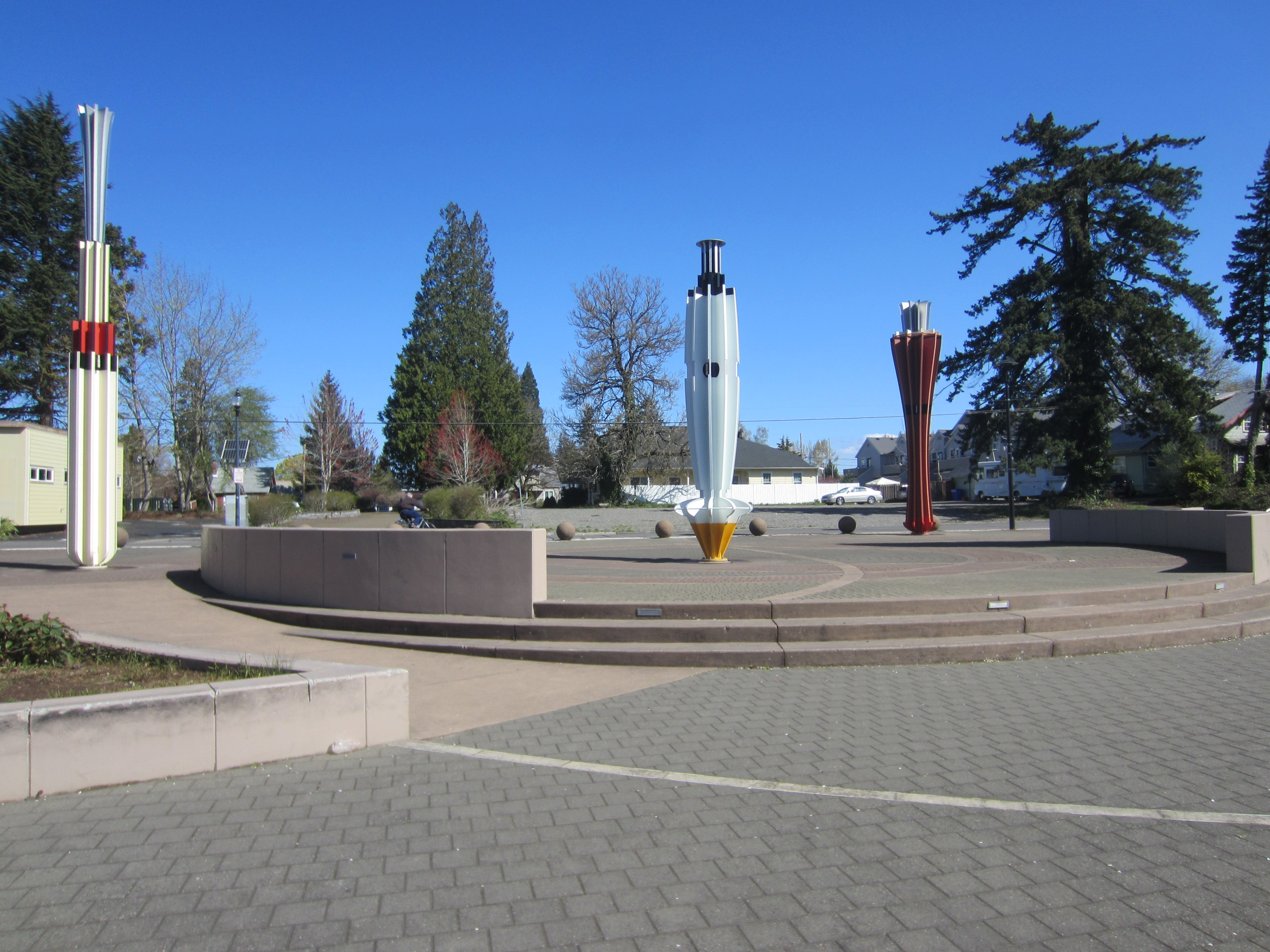
